Regiment University of Stellenbosch was an infantry regiment of the South African Army. As a reserve unit, it had a status roughly equivalent to that of a British Army Reserve or United States Army National Guard unit. It was part of the South African Army Infantry Corps.

History

Origins
In the late 1950s in South Africa, military units were attached to each large university. The University of Stellenbosch acquired an infantry capability transferred from the previous Regiment Tobie Muller itself dating from November 1953.

The regiment was renamed in January 1960.  
The concept was for long term students to complete their obligatory military training in these units. Training would also be organised so as not to unduly interfere with university work.

Operations
The Regiment was deployed for border duty in South West Africa as well as for internal unrest mainly in the Cape Province throughout the 1970s.

Regimental Emblems

References

South African Army
Artillery regiments of South Africa
Military units and formations established in 1960
Military units and formations disestablished in 1970